Michael-Leon Wooley (born March 29, 1971) is an American actor. Wooley was the voice of Louis the Alligator in Disney's Oscar-nominated animated feature film, The Princess and the Frog and played Judge Grady on the radio station WKTT in Rockstar's Grand Theft Auto IV.

Early life 
Wooley was born in Fairfax, Virginia, to George and Winnie Wooley. He has a twin brother, Marcus-Leon, and a younger brother, George Jr. He grew up in Bowie, Maryland. Wooley began playing the piano at age five and initially wanted to be a classical concert pianist. However, after participating in a high-school production of Oklahoma! he became interested in theatre.

At sixteen, he was given the opportunity to study piano at the Duke Ellington School of the Arts in Washington, D.C., but turned it down to instead focus on acting and singing. At age eighteen Wooley was awarded a full scholarship to the American Musical and Dramatic Academy (AMDA) in New York City, one of 21 scholarships granted in a nationwide competition. He studied at AMDA for a year before embarking on his own to pursue an acting career.

Wooley performed in the national tour of Purlie, after which, worked as a singing waiter on the Spirit of New York, a dinner cruise ship that circles Manhattan.

Career

Theatre 
In 1992, Wooley made his Broadway debut as an understudy (Big Moe) in the Clarke Peters' musical, Five Guys Named Moe. After Five Guys Named Moe he embarked on national tours with The Pointer Sisters in Ain't Misbehavin' and The Wiz with Stephanie Mills. He returned to Broadway in 2000 as Olin Britt in the Broadway revival of The Music Man, directed and choreographed by Susan Stroman.

He was also the voice of the man-eating plant, Audrey II, in the 2003 Broadway revival of the musical Little Shop of Horrors at the Virginia Theatre (renamed the August Wilson Theatre in 2005). Ben Brantley of the New York Times wrote Wooley had a "soulful bass voice" and Clive Barnes of the New York Post said Wooley as the "doom-struck voice of Audrey II" rounded out "one of the best casts on Broadway."

With conductor, Skitch Henderson, Wooley made his Carnegie Hall debut with the New York Pops as one of the "New Faces of 2004," along with other Broadway notables such as John Tartaglia and Stephanie D'Abruzzo, the stars of the Broadway's Avenue Q. The event was hosted by New York Post gossip columnist Liz Smith.

Film 
Wooley was the voice of Louis the jazz trumpet-playing alligator, in Disney's The Princess and the Frog; and Tiny Joe Dixon in the 2006 motion picture, Dreamgirls, singing "Takin' The Long Way Home" on the film's soundtrack. He also played Cocoa Butter in the Netflix Original series AJ and the Queen.

Voice work
Wooley's voice has been heard in many television ad campaigns for Reebok, General Motors, McDonald's, Dairy Queen, K-Mart, Oxygen Network and others. He was the voice of the demon boss, Twayne Boneraper, on Comedy Central's Ugly Americans. He made numerous guest appearances on Cosby, Law & Order: Special Victims Unit, The Knights of Prosperity, Now & Again, Rescue Me and The Rosie O'Donnell Show. He was a guest singer on The Penguins of Madagascar in "The Falcon and the Snow Job" and voiced the DC Comics villains Darkseid and Kalibak on the animated series, Batman: The Brave and the Bold.

From 2013 to 2014, Wooley voiced Tobias Whale in Beware the Batman. In 2014, he voiced Chill Bill from Sanjay and Craig as well as Master Lun in Kung Fu Panda: Legends of Awesomeness and Pumpers in Breadwinners. In 2015 and 2017, he was a guest voice on Penn Zero: Part-Time Hero and Acorn and Achaka in the 2015–16 video game series King's Quest. He voices Judge Grady on radio station WKTT, in the video game Grand Theft Auto IV and Dexter DeShawn in the video game Cyberpunk 2077.

Web series
In 2012, he voiced Impossibear in Pendleton Ward's Bravest Warriors which airs on Frederator's YouTube funded channel Cartoon Hangover.

Personal life 
Jon-Marc McDonald, a close friend and sometimes-publicist for Wooley, confirmed on his website that Wooley performed We Have To Change at a fundraiser for Barack Obama in New York City on August 11, 2008. The song was specifically written for the fundraiser by Bill Russell and Henry Krieger.

Filmography

Film

Television

Video games

References

External links

20th-century American male actors
21st-century American male actors
1971 births
20th-century African-American people
21st-century African-American people
Living people
Actors from Fairfax, Virginia
African-American activists
African-American male actors
American male film actors
American male stage actors
American male television actors
American male video game actors
American male voice actors
Male actors from Virginia
American Musical and Dramatic Academy alumni